Vauville may refer to the following communes in France:

Vauville, Calvados
Vauville, Manche